Neopachylaelaps is a genus of mites in the family Pachylaelapidae. This genus has a single species, Neopachylaelaps mancus.

References

Acari